Rodrigo Ponce de León, 4th Duke of Arcos, (2 January 1602 – 1658) was a Grandee of Spain and a Knight of the Order of the Golden Fleece. He served as Viceroy of Valencia and of Naples.

As Viceroy of Naples, the Duke of Arcos suppressed a revolt inhabitants of the city of Naples led by Masaniello but was soon faced with another revolt against Spanish rule, which resulted in the proclamation of the short-lived Neapolitan Republic.

References

1602 births
1658 deaths
Viceroys of Naples
Viceroys of Valencia
Dukes of Arcos
Marquesses of Zahara
Knights of the Golden Fleece
Rodrigo
Grandees of Spain